Neil Boyal (born May 20, 1998) is an American soccer player who currently plays as a midfielder.

Career

Youth & college
Boyal was born in Modesto, California, but was raised in Olympia, Washington and attended Olympia High School. He also played with the Seattle Sounders FC Academy and trained with Seattle Sounders FC 2. Boyal was named First Team All-State at Olympia, where he was also named the All-Area Boys Soccer Performer of the Year in 2015.

In 2017, Boyal attended Drexel University to play college soccer. In two seasons with the Dragons, Boyal made 27 appearances, scoring one goal and tallying two assists, and was named to the CAA All-Rookie Team in 2017. Boyal transferred to the University of Louisville in 2019, but only made eight appearances during his single season with the Cardinals. Boyal once again transferred college in 2020, this time to California Polytechnic State University, San Luis Obispo. He redshirted the season in 2020 due to the COVID-19 pandemic, then made 16 appearances, scoring a single goal and adding five assists in 2021.

Central Valley Fuego
On March 9, 2022, Boyal signed with USL League One expansion club Central Valley Fuego FC ahead of their inaugural season. He made his competitive debut for the club in its opening match of the season, appearing as an injury-time substitute during a 2–0 victory over the Greenville Triumph.

References

External links

1998 births
Living people
American soccer players
Association football midfielders
Cal Poly Mustangs men's soccer players
Central Valley Fuego FC players
Drexel Dragons men's soccer players
Louisville Cardinals men's soccer players
People from Olympia, Washington
Soccer players from Washington (state)
USL League One players
Sportspeople from the Seattle metropolitan area